The 2014–15 NBA Development League season was the 14th season of the NBA Development League (NBA D-League). The NBA D-League is the official minor league basketball organization owned by the National Basketball Association (NBA). The NBA D-League will expand to a record 18 teams for the 2014–15 season. For the first time in league history the NBA D-League was aligned into two conferences with two divisions each, two with five and two with four.

One expansion team, the Westchester Knicks, joined the 17 teams from the previous season. The Springfield Armor relocated to Grand Rapids, and were renamed the Grand Rapids Drive, and the Tulsa 66ers relocated to Oklahoma City, and were renamed to Oklahoma City Blue.

Teams
Austin Spurs (affiliated with the San Antonio Spurs)
Bakersfield Jam (affiliated with the Phoenix Suns)
Canton Charge (affiliated with the Cleveland Cavaliers)
Delaware 87ers (affiliated with the Philadelphia 76ers)
Erie BayHawks (affiliated with the Orlando Magic)
Fort Wayne Mad Ants (affiliated with 13 teams)
Grand Rapids Drive (affiliated with the Detroit Pistons)
Idaho Stampede (affiliated with the Utah Jazz)
Iowa Energy (affiliated with the Memphis Grizzlies)
Los Angeles D-Fenders (affiliated with the Los Angeles Lakers)
Maine Red Claws (affiliated with the Boston Celtics)
Oklahoma City Blue (affiliated with the Oklahoma City Thunder)
Reno Bighorns (affiliated with the Sacramento Kings)
Rio Grande Valley Vipers (affiliated with the Houston Rockets)
Santa Cruz Warriors (affiliated with the Golden State Warriors)
Sioux Falls Skyforce (affiliated with the Miami Heat)
Texas Legends (affiliated with the Dallas Mavericks)
Westchester Knicks (affiliated with the New York Knicks)

Regular season

Eastern Conference

East Division

Central Division

Western Conference

Southwest  Division

West Division

Playoffs
The Santa Cruz Warriors won the D-League title, doing so in two games over the Fort Wayne Mad Ants, doing so with a win in Game 1 by a score of 119-115 and a win in Game 2 by a score of 109-96.

Awards and honors
NBA Development League Most Valuable Player Award: Tim Frazier, Maine Red Claws
Dennis Johnson Coach of the Year Award: Scott Morrison, Maine Red Claws
NBA Development League Rookie of the Year Award: Tim Frazier, Maine Red Claws
NBA Development League Defensive Player of the Year Award:  Aaron Craft, Santa Cruz Warriors
NBA Development League Impact Player of the Year Award: Jerel McNeal, Bakersfield Jam
NBA Development League Most Improved Player Award: Joe Jackson, Bakersfield Jam
Executive of the Year: Tim Salier, Austin Spurs
Jason Collier Sportsmanship Award: Renaldo Major, Bakersfield Jam
Development Champion Award: Fort Wayne Mad Ants
All-Star Game MVP: Andre Emmett, Fort Wayne Mad Ants
All-NBA Development League Team:

First team
Jerrelle Benimon, Idaho Stampede		
Seth Curry, Erie BayHawks		
Earl Barron, Bakersfield Jam		
Tim Frazier, Maine Red Claws		
Willie Reed, Grand Rapids Drive		

Second team
Chris Babb, Maine Red Claws
Bryce Cotton, Austin Spurs
James Michael McAdoo, Santa Cruz Warriors
Arinze Onuaku, Canton Charge
Elliot Williams, Santa Cruz Warriors

Third team
Jabari Brown, Los Angeles D-Fenders
Eric Griffin, Texas Legends
Jerel McNeal, Bakersfield Jam
Adonis Thomas, Grand Rapids Drive
Damien Wilkins, Iowa Energy

References

External links
Official site